Härjedalen Municipality is a municipality in Jämtland County in northern Sweden. Its seat is located in Sveg.

The municipality roughly, but not exactly, corresponds with the traditional province Härjedalen.

The municipality was created in 1974 and is one of two in Sweden with the name of a province (Gotland Municipality is the other). It consists of nine original local government entities (as of 1863).

Geography
However, it is largely wilderness, and the municipality is sparsely inhabited. For comparison, the municipality covers as much territory as Uppsala County and Stockholm County combined, but those two counties have over 2,000,000 inhabitants.

Localities

There are eight localities (or urban areas) in Härjedalen Municipality:

The municipal seat in bold

Riksdag

This table lists the national results since the 1972 Swedish municipality reform. The results of the Sweden Democrats from 1988 to 1998 were not published by the SCB at a municipal level due to the party's small size nationally at the time.

Blocs

This lists the relative strength of the socialist and centre-right blocs since 1973, but parties not elected to the Riksdag are inserted as "other", including the Sweden Democrats results from 1988 to 2006, but also the Christian Democrats pre-1991 and the Greens in 1982, 1985 and 1991. The sources are identical to the table above. The coalition or government mandate marked in bold formed the government after the election. New Democracy got elected in 1991 but are still listed as "other" due to the short lifespan of the party. "Elected" is the total number of percentage points from the municipality that went to parties who were elected to the Riksdag.

Notable natives
Henning Mankell, author
Anna Carin Zidek, sportsperson
Marcus Högström, ice hockey professional

References

External links

Härjedalen Municipality  - Official site

Municipalities of Jämtland County
Härjedalen